Pouteria obovata is a tree in the family Sapotaceae. Confusingly, this is not the same plant that was formerly known by the same scientific name, the Andean Pouteria lucuma. The common name in Australia is the northern yellow boxwood. It occurs in many parts of south-east Asia, Micronesia, and on islands of the Indian Ocean, and has local common names there.

The tree was first described as Sersalisia obovata by Robert Brown  in his 1810 work Prodromus Florae Novae Hollandiae, before being moved to its current binomial name by Baehni in 1942. The specific epithet obovata refers to the reverse ovate shape of the leaf. There is discussion whether this plant should remain named as Planchonella obovata, with the Queensland herbarium supporting this. A genetic analysis of material found that material from Papua New Guinea was isolated and was a sister to a group comprising material from Australia and Indonesia. Indumentum was present on the leaf surface of the Australian and Indonesian samples, and absent in material from Papua New Guinea.

The leaves hairy when young, with upper surfaces becoming smooth and shiny. Appearing from August to October, the tiny greenish-white flowers grow in clusters. Flowering is followed by round red or blue berries  in diameter. Each berry contains one to five seeds which are yellow when ripe.

It can be grown in conditions with good drainage with sunny aspect, and can be propagated by seed. The wood is used for turning and cabinet-making.

References

obovata
Trees of Australia
Flora of Queensland
Trees of China
Flora of tropical Asia
Trees of Seychelles
Plants described in 1810